The 2003 African Youth Championship was an association football tournament for under-20 players (born in 1983 and before). It was held in Burkina Faso from January 4 until January 18. The top four teams qualified for the 2003 FIFA World Youth Championship.

Qualification

Preliminary round

The first leg was played on either 6, 7 or 8 April 2002.  The second leg was held on either 19, 20 or 21 April 2002.  The winners advanced to the First Round.

|}

First round
The First Round first leg matches were held on 20 and 21 July 2002. The second leg matches were held on 10 and 11 August 2002. The winners qualified for the Second Round.

|}

Second round
The Second Round first leg matches were played on 28 and 29 September 2002. The second leg matches was played on 20 October 2002. The winners of the aggregate of the two legs qualified for the Finals.

|}

Final tournament

The final tournament, consisting of 8 teams, were held from 18 March to 1 April 2003.
 
 
 
 
 
  (hosts)

Referees

Group stage

Group A

Group B

Knock-out stage

Semifinals

Third place

Final

Qualification to World Youth Championship
The four best performing teams qualified for the 2003 FIFA World Youth Championship.

External links
Results by RSSSF

Africa U-20 Cup of Nations
Youth
1991
2003 in Burkinabé sport
2003 in youth association football